Lola is an American gag-a-day comic strip by Todd Clark syndicated since 1999. It is published daily and centers on the eponymous Lola Rayder, an old widow who moved in with her son and his family after the death of her husband, Crawford.

Characters
Lola Rayder, the protagonist.
Ray Rayder, Lola's son with whom she lives.
Amy Rayder, Ray's wife.
Sammy Rayder, Ray's son. He has red hair and wears glasses.
Etta, a black woman with whom Lola is friends.
Cecil, a bearded friend of Lola's.
Sally, a friend of Lola's.
Harry, another friend of Lola's.
Leeanne, a friend of Sammy's.
Claudia, a neighbour of the Rayders.
Rhiannon, a child who lives in the same neighbourhood as the Rayders.
Pastor John, Local Pastor from Lola's church (Lola goes to church?)

References

External links
 

American comic strips
1999 comics debuts
Gag-a-day comics
Comics characters introduced in 1999
Female characters in comics
Comics set in the United States
Works about old age